Algot Malmberg (1 February 1903 – 22 January 1971) was a Swedish wrestler. He competed in the men's freestyle lightweight at the 1928 Summer Olympics. He is the brother of Erik Malmberg.

References

External links
 

1903 births
1971 deaths
Swedish male sport wrestlers
Olympic wrestlers of Sweden
Wrestlers at the 1928 Summer Olympics
Sportspeople from Gothenburg